The 2018–19 season is Nottingham Forest's 153rd season in existence and 11th consecutive season in the EFL Championship. In addition to the Championship, the club will participate in the FA Cup and EFL Cup. The season covers the period between 1 July 2018 and 30 June 2019.

First team

Pre-season friendlies

Competitions

Championship

League table

Results summary

Results by matchday

Matches

FA Cup

EFL Cup

Goals and appearances

 
 

''

|}

Transfers

Transfers in

Transfers out

Loans in

Loans out

New contracts

Awards

Club
Nottingham Forest Player of the Season

Nottingham Forest Goal of the Season

League
EFL Championship Player of the Month

Sky Bet Championship Goal of the Month

Cups
EFL Cup Player of the Round

Other
PFA Player of the Month

References

Nottingham Forest
Nottingham Forest F.C. seasons